Aleida Assmann (born Aleida Bornkamm, 22 March 1947) is a German professor of English and Literary Studies, who studied Egyptology and whose work has focused on cultural anthropology and Cultural and Communicative Memory.

Life 
She studied English and Egyptology at the universities of Heidelberg and Tübingen from 1966 to 1972. In 1977 she wrote her dissertation in Heidelberg about The Legitimacy of Fiction (Die Legitimation der Fiktion). She had to take her minor field examination in Egyptology in Tübingen because her husband Jan Assmann had become a professor of Egyptology in Heidelberg.

In 1992 Assmann completed her habilitation in Heidelberg. In 1993 she became a professor of English and Literary Studies at the University of Konstanz, where she remained to 2014. She was a visiting professor at Rice University in Houston (2000), at Princeton University in 2001, at Yale University in 2002, 2003 and 2005, and at the University of Vienna in 2005. She was visiting professor at the University of Chicago in 2007.

Assmann's early works were about English literature and the history of literary communication. Since the 1990s her focus has been on cultural anthropology, especially Cultural and Communicative Memory, terms she and her husband coined and developed. Her specific interests is focused on the history of German memory since 1945, the role of generations in literature and society, and theories of memory.

Since 2011 she has been working on a research project titled The Past in the Present: Dimensions and Dynamics of Cultural Memory. This project summarizes in English her and Jan Assmann's work on cultural memory.

Awards 

In 2014, she received the Heineken Prize for history from the Royal Netherlands Academy of Arts and Sciences. In 2017, she was awarded the Balzan Prize for Collective Memory together with her husband Jan Assmann. In 2018, she was awarded the Friedenspreis des Deutschen Buchhandels together with her husband, honouring their work "sustainable peace and understanding among the peoples of the world". Since 2020, Assmann has been member of the order Pour le Mérite for Sciences and Arts, together with her husband. In 2021 she was elected a corresponding fellow of the British Academy.

Honorary doctorates 
 2008 University of Oslo

Bibliography

 
 
 Zeit und Tradition. Kulturelle Strategien der Dauer. (Beiträge zur Geschichtskultur vol. 15)(Cologne, Weimar, Vienna: Böhlau, 1999)
 Geschichtsvergessenheit - Geschichtsversessenheit: Vom Umgang mit deutschen Vergangenheiten nach 1945. (Stuttgart: Deutsche Verlags-Anstalt, 1999) (with Ute Frevert)
 Erinnerungsräume: Formen und Wandlungen des kulturellen Gedächtnisses. (Munich: C.H. Beck, 1999).
 Engführung des kulturellen Gedächtnisses: Die Germanistik in Deutschland steht im Banne eines post-traumatischen Literaturkanons in: Frankfurter Rundschau (23 April 2002)
 Das kulturelle Gedächtnis an der Millenniumsschwelle. Krise und Zukunft der Bildung, (Constance: UVK, 2004)
 Die Unverzichtbarkeit der Kulturwissenschaften mit einem nachfolgenden Briefwechsel. (Hildesheimer Universitätsreden. Neue Folge Heft 2) (Hildesheim: Universitätsverlag, 2004)
 Generationsidentitäten und Vorurteilsstrukturen in der neuen deutschen Erinnerungsliteratur (Wiener Vorlesungen im Rathaus, vol. 117, ed. by Hubert Christian Ehalt) (Vienna: Picus, 2006)
 Einführung in die Kulturwissenschaft. Grundbegriffe, Themen, Fragestellungen (Berlin: Erich Schmidt, 2006)
 Der lange Schatten der Vergangenheit. Erinnerungskultur und Geschichtspolitik. (Munich: C.H. Beck, 2006)
 "Memory, Individual and Collective", in: Robert E. Goodin and Charles Tilly (eds.): The Oxford Handbook of Contextual Political Analysis (Oxford: OUP, 2006), pp. 210–224
 Geschichte im Gedächtnis: Von der individuellen Erfahrung zur öffentlichen Inszenierung. (Munich: C.H. Beck, 2007).
 
 
 
 "Die Last der Vergangenheit," in: Zeithistorische Forschungen 3(2008), pp. 375–385
 "The Religious Roots of Cultural Memory," in: Norsk teologisk tidsskrift 4(2008), pp. 270–292
 "Vom Vergessen der Kunst. Grenzüberlegungen zur Kulturanthropologie. Im Gespräch mit Renate Solbach," in: Ulrich Schödlbauer (ed.), Die Enden der Kunst: Die Kultur der Gesellschaft (Heidelberg: Manutius, 2008), pp. 109–129
 "Sammeln, Sammlungen, Sammler," in: Kay Junge, Daniel Suber, and Gerold Gerber (eds.), Erleben, Erleiden, Erfahren: Die Konstitution sozialen Sinns jenseits instrumenteller Vernunft (Bielefeld: transcript, 2008), pp. 345–353
 "Von kollektiver Gewalt zu gemeinsamer Zukunft: Vier Modelle für den Umgang mit traumatischer Vergangenheit," in: Kerstin Lingen (ed.), Kriegserfahrung und nationale Identität in Europa nach 1945: Erinnerung, Säuberungsprozesse und nationales Gedächtnis (Paderborn: Schöningh, 2009), pp. 42–51
 translated: "From Collective Violence to a Common Future: Four Models for Dealing with a Traumatic Past," in: Helen Gonçalves da Silva et al. (eds.), Conflict, Memory Transfers and the Reshaping of Europe (Newcastle upon Tyne: Cambridge Scholars Publishing, 2010), 8-23
 "Vom Zentrum zur Peripherie und zurück: Reisen ins Herz der Finsternis," in: Matthias Theodor Vogt (ed.), Peripherie in der Mitte Europas (Frankfurt: Lang, 2009), pp. 61–77
 ed.: Vollkommenheit (Archäologie der literarischen Kommunikation 10) (Munich: Fink, 2010)
 "Vergessen oder Erinnern? Wege aus einer gemeinsamen Gewaltgeschichte," in: Sabina Ferhadbegovic and Brigitte Weiffen (eds.), Bürgerkriege erzählen: Zum Verlauf unziviler Konflikte (Constance: Konstanz University Press, 2011), pp. 303–320
 "Wem gehört die Geschichte? Fakten und Fiktionen in der neueren deutschen Erinnerungsliteratur," in: Internationales Archiv für Sozialgeschichte der deutschen Literatur 36:1 (2011), pp. 213–225
 Die Zukunft der Erinnerung und der Holocaust (with Geoffrey Hartman) (Constance: Konstanz University Press 2012)
 Auf dem Weg zu einer europäischen Gedächtniskultur? with a preface by Hubert Christian Ehalt (Wiener Vorlesungen im Rathaus vol. 161) (Vienna: Picus, 2012)
 Cultural Memory and Western Civilization: Functions, Media, Archives (Cambridge: Cambridge University Press, 2012)

References

External links 
 Aleida Assmann www.knaw.nl/en
 Aleida and Jan Assmann / Germany / 2017 Balzan Prize for Collective Memory balzan.org
 Friedenspreis des Deutschen Buchhandels / "Wahr ist, was uns verbindet!" Deutschlandfunk 14 October 2018
 Aleida Assmann: Was bedeutet eigentlich Erinnerung? January 2011
 Aleida Assmann: Soziales und kollektives Gedächtnis (PDF; 122 kB)

1947 births
Living people
Writers from Bielefeld
Winners of the Heineken Prize
Academic staff of the University of Konstanz
Officers Crosses of the Order of Merit of the Federal Republic of Germany
Members of the Austrian Academy of Sciences
Members of the Göttingen Academy of Sciences and Humanities
Cultural anthropologists